Chesson Tyler Hadley (born July 5, 1987) is an American professional golfer who plays on the PGA Tour.

Amateur career
Hadley was born in Raleigh, North Carolina on July 5, 1987 to Russell and Edna Ruth Hadley. He started playing golf at North Ridge Country Club and then for his high school, North Raleigh Christian Academy. He played college golf at Georgia Tech where he was a three-time All-American and won two events including the 2010 Atlantic Coast Conference championship. He played on the 2008 Palmer Cup team.

Professional career
Hadley turned professional in 2010. He played on the Web.com Tour in 2013 and won his first tour event in June at the Rex Hospital Open.  He finished third on the 2013 Web.com Tour regular season money list to earn his 2014 PGA Tour card.

Hadley captured his first PGA Tour win on March 9, 2014 with a two-shot victory in the Puerto Rico Open played at the Trump International course. Hadley shot a tournament record 21-under and earned $630,000. He also earned a two-year tour exemption and spots in The Players Championship, PGA Championship, and Hyundai Tournament of Champions. 

Hadley ranked 49th in the 2014 FedEx Cup Playoffs including finishing 9th at the Deutsche Bank Championship. He also won the PGA Tour Rookie of the Year.

Hadley lost his PGA Tour card at the end of the 2016 season and dropped back to the Web.com Tour. His third career win on that tour, in July 2017 at the LECOM Health Challenge, ensured his return to the PGA Tour. He picked up another win in September at the Albertsons Boise Open. He was the Web.com Tour Finals winner and the overall money winner and was voted Web.com Tour Player of the Year.

In June 2021, Hadley led the Palmetto Championship by four strokes heading into the final round. Hadley ended up bogeying his last three holes of the day to shoot 75 and lose by one stroke to Garrick Higgo. Hadley ended up in a six-way tie for second place. Hadley finished the season with the 125th and final fully exempt position in the FedEx Cup standings.

Personal life
Hadley married wife Amanda on July 17, 2010; the couple has one son, Hughes and one daughter, Hollins. Hadley is naturally left-handed but plays right-handed.

Professional wins (6)

PGA Tour wins (1)

Web.com Tour wins (4)

Web.com Tour playoff record (0–2)

Other wins (1)
2012 River Landing Open (eGolf Tour)

Results in major championships
Results not in chronological order in 2020.

CUT = missed the half-way cut
"T" indicates a tie for a place
NT = No tournament

Results in The Players Championship

CUT = missed the halfway cut
"T" indicates a tie for a place
C = Canceled after the first round due to the COVID-19 pandemic

U.S. national team appearances
Amateur
Palmer Cup: 2008

See also
2013 Web.com Tour Finals graduates
2017 Web.com Tour Finals graduates
List of golfers with most Web.com Tour wins

References

External links

Had's corner Hadley's personal blog

American male golfers
Georgia Tech Yellow Jackets men's golfers
PGA Tour golfers
Korn Ferry Tour graduates
Golfers from Raleigh, North Carolina
1987 births
Living people